Justin Hardee (born February 7, 1994) is an American football cornerback and special teamer for the New York Jets of the National Football League (NFL). He played college football at Illinois.

College career
Hardee committed to Illinois as a three-star prospect out of Cleveland, Ohio where he racked up a total of 841 yards receiving throughout his entire career.

College statistics

Professional career

Houston Texans
Hardee was signed by the Houston Texans as an undrafted free agent on May 12, 2017. He was waived on September 2, 2017.

New Orleans Saints
On September 7, 2017, Hardee was signed to the New Orleans Saints' practice squad. He was promoted to the active roster on September 23, 2017. In Week 9, Hardee blocked a punt by Bryan Anger and returned it for a touchdown in a 30–10 win over the Buccaneers, earning him NFC Special Teams Player of the Week.

On March 23, 2020, Hardee re-signed with the Saints. He was placed on injured reserve on November 6, 2020, with a groin injury. He was activated on December 12, 2020.

New York Jets
Hardee signed a three-year $5.25 million contract with the New York Jets on March 18, 2021.

References

External links
Houston Texans bio

1994 births
Living people
American football cornerbacks
Houston Texans players
Illinois Fighting Illini football players
New Orleans Saints players
New York Jets players
Players of American football from Cleveland
American Conference Pro Bowl players